Uruk, today known as Warka, was an ancient city of Sumer (and later of Babylonia) situated east of the present bed of the Euphrates River on the dried-up ancient channel of the Euphrates  east of modern Samawah, Al-Muthannā, Iraq.

Uruk is the type site for the Uruk period. Uruk played a leading role in the early urbanization of Sumer in the mid-4th millennium BC.
By the final phase of the Uruk period around 3100 BC, the city may have had 40,000 residents, with 80,000-90,000 people living in its environs, making it the largest urban area in the world at the time. The legendary king Gilgamesh, according to the chronology presented in the Sumerian King List (henceforth SKL), ruled Uruk in the 27th century BC. The city lost its prime importance around 2000 BC in the context of the struggle of Babylonia against Elam, but it remained inhabited throughout the Seleucid (312–63 BC) and Parthian (227 BC to 224 AD) periods until it was finally abandoned shortly before or after the Islamic conquest of 633–638.

William Kennett Loftus visited the site of Uruk in 1849, identifying it as "Erech", known as "the second city of Nimrod", and led the first excavations from 1850 to 1854.

Etymology
Uruk has several spellings in cuneiform; in Sumerian it is  unugki; in Akkadian,  Uruk (URUUNUG).

Though the Arabic name of the present-day country of al-ʿIrāq is often thought to be derived from the name Uruk, it is more likely loaned via Middle Persian (Erāq) and then Aramaic ’yrg transmission.

Prominence

In myth and literature, Uruk was famous as the capital city of Gilgamesh, hero of the Epic of Gilgamesh. Scholars identify Uruk as the biblical Erech (Genesis 10:10), the second city founded by Nimrod in Shinar.

Uruk Period

In addition to being one of the first cities, Uruk was the main force of urbanization and state formation during the Uruk period, or 'Uruk expansion' (4000–3200 BC). This period of 800 years saw a shift from small, agricultural villages to a larger urban center with a full-time bureaucracy, military, and stratified society. Although other settlements coexisted with Uruk, they were generally about 10 hectares while Uruk was significantly larger and more complex. The Uruk period culture exported by Sumerian traders and colonists had an effect on all surrounding peoples, who gradually evolved their own comparable, competing economies and cultures. Ultimately, Uruk could not maintain long-distance control over colonies such as Tell Brak by military force.

Geographic Factors

Geographic factors underpin Uruk's unprecedented growth. The city was located in the southern part of Mesopotamia, an ancient site of civilization, on the Euphrates river. Through the gradual and eventual domestication of native grains from the Zagros foothills and extensive irrigation techniques, the area supported a vast variety of edible vegetation. This domestication of grain and its proximity to rivers enabled Uruk's growth into the largest Sumerian settlement, in both population and area, with relative ease.

Uruk's agricultural surplus and large population base facilitated processes such as trade, specialization of crafts and the evolution of writing; writing may have originated in Uruk around 3300 BC. Evidence from excavations such as extensive pottery and the earliest known tablets of writing support these events. Excavation of Uruk is highly complex because older buildings were recycled into newer ones, thus blurring the layers of different historic periods. The topmost layer most likely originated in the Jemdet Nasr period (3100–2900 BC) and is built on structures from earlier periods dating back to the Ubaid period.

History

According to the SKL, Uruk was founded by the king Enmerkar. Though the king-list mentions a father before him, the epic Enmerkar and the Lord of Aratta relates that Enmerkar constructed the House of Heaven (Sumerian: e2-anna; cuneiform:  E2.AN) for the goddess Inanna in the Eanna District of Uruk. In the Epic of Gilgamesh, Gilgamesh builds the city wall around Uruk and is king of the city.

Uruk went through several phases of growth, from the Early Uruk period (4000–3500 BC) to the Late Uruk period (3500–3100 BC). The city was formed when two smaller Ubaid settlements merged. The temple complexes at their cores became the Eanna District and the Anu District dedicated to Inanna and Anu, respectively. The Anu District was originally called 'Kullaba' (Kulab or Unug-Kulaba) prior to merging with the Eanna District. Kullaba dates to the Eridu period when it was one of the oldest and most important cities of Sumer. There are different interpretations about the purposes of the temples. However, it is generally believed they were a unifying feature of the city. It also seems clear that temples served both an important religious function and state function. The surviving temple archive of the Neo-Babylonian period documents the social function of the temple as a redistribution center.

The Eanna District was composed of several buildings with spaces for workshops, and it was walled off from the city. By contrast, the Anu District was built on a terrace with a temple at the top. It is clear Eanna was dedicated to Inanna from the earliest Uruk period throughout the history of the city.  The rest of the city was composed of typical courtyard houses, grouped by profession of the occupants, in districts around Eanna and Anu. Uruk was extremely well penetrated by a canal system that has been described as, "Venice in the desert."  This canal system flowed throughout the city connecting it with the maritime trade on the ancient Euphrates River as well as the surrounding agricultural belt.

The original city of Uruk was situated southwest of the ancient Euphrates River, now dry. Currently, the site of Warka is northeast of the modern Euphrates river. The change in position was caused by a shift in the Euphrates at some point in history, which, together with salination due to irrigation, may have contributed to the decline of Uruk.

Archaeological Levels of Uruk
Archeologists have discovered multiple cities of Uruk built atop each other in chronological order.
 Uruk XVIII Eridu period ( 5000 BC); the founding of Uruk
 Uruk XVIII-XVI Late Ubaid period (4800–4200 BC)
 Uruk XVI-X Early Uruk period (4000–3800 BC)
 Uruk IX-VI Middle Uruk period (3800–3400 BC)
 Uruk V-IV Late Uruk period (3400–3100 BC); The earliest monumental temples of Eanna District are built
 Uruk III Jemdet Nasr period (3100–2900 BC); The 9 km city wall is built
 Uruk II
 Uruk I

Anu District

The great Anu district is older than the Eanna district; however, few remains of writing have been found here. Unlike the Eanna district, the Anu district consists of a single massive terrace, the Anu Ziggurat, dedicated to the Sumerian sky god Anu. Sometime in the Uruk III period the massive White Temple was built atop of the ziggurat. Under the northwest edge of the ziggurat an Uruk VI period structure, the Stone Temple, has been discovered.

The Stone Temple was built of limestone and bitumen on a podium of rammed earth and plastered with lime mortar. The podium itself was built over a woven reed mat called ĝipar, which was ritually used as a nuptial bed. The ĝipar was a source of generative power which then radiated upward into the structure. The structure of the Stone Temple further develops some mythological concepts from Enuma Elish, perhaps involving libation rites as indicated from the channels, tanks, and vessels found there. The structure was ritually destroyed, covered with alternating layers of clay and stone, then excavated and filled with mortar sometime later.

The Anu Ziggurat began with a massive mound topped by a cella during the Uruk period (ca. 4000 BC), and was expanded through 14 phases of construction. These phases have been labeled L to A3 (L is sometimes called X). The earliest phase used architectural features similar to PPNA cultures in Anatolia: a single chamber cella with a terrazzo floor beneath which bucrania were found. In phase E, corresponding to the Uruk III period (ca. 3000 BC), the White Temple was built. The White Temple could be seen from a great distance across the plain of Sumer, as it was elevated 21 m and covered in gypsum plaster which reflected sunlight like a mirror. For this reason it is believed the White Temple is a symbol of Uruk's political power at the time. In addition to this temple the Anu Ziggurat had a monumental limestone-paved staircase, which was used in religious processions. A trough running parallel to the staircase was used to drain the ziggurat.

Eanna District

The Eanna district is historically significant as both writing and monumental public architecture emerged here during Uruk periods VI-IV. The combination of these two developments places Eanna as arguably the first true city and civilization in human history. Eanna during period IVa contains the earliest examples of cuneiform writing and possibly the earliest writing in history. Although some of these cuneiform tablets have been deciphered, difficulty with site excavations has obscured the purpose and sometimes even the structure of many buildings.

The first building of Eanna, Stone-Cone Temple (Mosaic Temple), was built in period VI over a preexisting Ubaid temple and is enclosed by a limestone wall with an elaborate system of buttresses. The Stone-Cone Temple, named for the mosaic of colored stone cones driven into the adobe brick façade, may be the earliest water cult in Mesopotamia. It was ritually demolished in Uruk IVb period and its contents interred in the Riemchen Building.

In the following period, Uruk V, about 100 m east of the Stone-Cone Temple the Limestone Temple was built on a 2 m high rammed-earth podium over a pre-existing Ubaid temple, which like the Stone-Cone Temple represents a continuation of Ubaid culture. However, the Limestone Temple was unprecedented for its size and use of stone, a clear departure from traditional Ubaid architecture. The stone was quarried from an outcrop at Umayyad about 60 km east of Uruk. It is unclear if the entire temple or just the foundation was built of this limestone. The Limestone temple is probably the first Inanna temple, but it is impossible to know with certainty. Like the Stone-Cone temple the Limestone temple was also covered in cone mosaics. Both of these temples were rectangles with their corners aligned to the cardinal directions, a central hall flanked along the long axis flanked by two smaller halls, and buttressed façades; the prototype of all future Mesopotamian temple architectural typology.

Between these two monumental structures a complex of buildings (called A-C, E-K, Riemchen, Cone-Mosaic), courts, and walls was built during Eanna IVb. These buildings were built during a time of great expansion in Uruk as the city grew to 250 hectares and established long-distance trade, and are a continuation of architecture from the previous period. The Riemchen Building, named for the 16×16 cm brick shape called Riemchen by the Germans, is a memorial with a ritual fire kept burning in the center for the Stone-Cone Temple after it was destroyed. For this reason, Uruk IV period represents a reorientation of belief and culture. The facade of this memorial may have been covered in geometric and figural murals. The Riemchen bricks first used in this temple were used to construct all buildings of Uruk IV period Eanna. The use of colored cones as a façade treatment was greatly developed as well, perhaps used to greatest effect in the Cone-Mosaic Temple. Composed of three parts: Temple N, the Round Pillar Hall, and the Cone-Mosaic Courtyard, this temple was the most monumental structure of Eanna at the time. They were all ritually destroyed and the entire Eanna district was rebuilt in period IVa at an even grander scale.

During Eanna IVa, the Limestone Temple was demolished and the Red Temple built on its foundations. The accumulated debris of the Uruk IVb buildings were formed into a terrace, the L-Shaped Terrace, on which Buildings C, D, M, Great Hall, and Pillar Hall were built. Building E was initially thought to be a palace, but later proven to be a communal building. Also in period IV, the Great Court, a sunken courtyard surrounded by two tiers of benches covered in cone mosaic, was built. A small aqueduct drains into the Great Courtyard, which may have irrigated a garden at one time. The impressive buildings of this period were built as Uruk reached its zenith and expanded to 600 hectares. All the buildings of Eanna IVa were destroyed sometime in Uruk III, for unclear reasons.

The architecture of Eanna in period III was very different from what had preceded it. The complex of monumental temples was replaced with baths around the Great Courtyard and the labyrinthine Rammed-Earth Building. This period corresponds to Early Dynastic Sumer  2900 BC, a time of great social upheaval when the dominance of Uruk was eclipsed by competing city-states. The fortress-like architecture of this time is a reflection of that turmoil. The temple of Inanna continued functioning during this time in a new form and under a new name, 'The House of Inanna in Uruk' (Sumerian: e2-dinanna unuki-ga). The location of this structure is currently unknown.

Uruk into Late Antiquity
Although it had been a thriving city in Early Dynastic Sumer, especially Early Dynastic II, Uruk was ultimately annexed by the Akkadian Empire and went into decline. Later, in the Neo-Sumerian period, Uruk enjoyed revival as a major economic and cultural center under the sovereignty of Ur. The Eanna District was restored as part of an ambitious building program, which included a new temple for Inanna. This temple included a ziggurat, the 'House of the Universe' (Cuneiform: E2.SAR.A) to the northeast of the Uruk period Eanna ruins.

The ziggurat is also cited as Ur-Nammu Ziggurat for its builder Ur-Nammu. Following the collapse of Ur ( 2000 BC), Uruk went into a steep decline until about 850 BC when the Neo-Assyrian Empire annexed it as a provincial capital. Under the Neo-Assyrians and Neo-Babylonians, Uruk regained much of its former glory. By 250 BC, a new temple complex the 'Head Temple' (Akkadian: Bīt Reš) was added to northeast of the Uruk period Anu district. The Bīt Reš along with the Esagila was one of the two main centers of Neo-Babylonian astronomy. All of the temples and canals were restored again under Nabopolassar. During this era, Uruk was divided into five main districts: the Adad Temple, Royal Orchard, Ištar Gate, Lugalirra Temple, and Šamaš Gate districts.

Uruk, known as Orcha (Ὄρχα) to the Greeks, continued to thrive under the Seleucid Empire. During this period, Uruk was a city of 300 hectares and perhaps 40,000 inhabitants. In 200 BC, the 'Great Sanctuary' (Cuneiform: E2.IRI12.GAL, Sumerian: eš-gal) of Ishtar was added between the Anu and Eanna districts. The ziggurat of the temple of Anu, which was rebuilt in this period, was the largest ever built in Mesopotamia. When the Seleucids lost Mesopotamia to the Parthians in 141 BC, Uruk again entered a period of decline from which it never recovered. The decline of Uruk may have been in part caused by a shift in the Euphrates River. By 300 AD, Uruk was mostly abandoned, but a group of Mandaeans settled there, and by  700 AD it was completely abandoned.

Political History

"In Uruk, in southern Mesopotamia, Sumerian civilization seems to have reached its creative peak. This is pointed out repeatedly in the references to this city in religious and, especially, in literary texts, including those of mythological content; the historical tradition as preserved in the Sumerian king-list confirms it. From Uruk the center of political gravity seems to have moved to Ur." —Oppenheim

Uruk played a very important part in the political history of Sumer. Starting from the Early Uruk period, the city exercised hegemony over nearby settlements. At this time ( 3800 BC), there were two centers of 20 hectares, Uruk in the south and Nippur in the north surrounded by much smaller 10 hectare settlements. Later, in the Late Uruk period, its sphere of influence extended over all Sumer and beyond to external colonies in upper Mesopotamia and Syria. Uruk was prominent in the national struggles of the Sumerians against the Elamites up to 2004 BC, in which it suffered severely; recollections of some of these conflicts are embodied in the Gilgamesh epic, in the literary and courtly form.

The recorded chronology of rulers over Uruk includes both mythological and historic figures in five dynasties. As in the rest of Sumer, power moved progressively from the temple to the palace. Rulers from the Early Dynastic period exercised control over Uruk and at times over all of Sumer. In myth, kingship was lowered from heaven to Eridu then passed successively through five cities until the deluge which ended the Uruk period. Afterwards, kingship passed to Kish at the beginning of the Early Dynastic period, which corresponds to the beginning of the Early Bronze Age in Sumer. In the Early Dynastic I period (2900–2800 BC), Uruk was in theory under the control of Kish. This period is sometimes called the Golden Age. During the Early Dynastic II period (2800–2600 BC), Uruk was again the dominant city exercising control of Sumer. This period is the time of the First Dynasty of Uruk sometimes called the Heroic Age. However, by the Early Dynastic IIIa period (2600–2500 BC) Uruk had lost sovereignty, this time to Ur. This period, corresponding to the Early Bronze Age III, is the end of the First Dynasty of Uruk. In the Early Dynastic IIIb period (2500–2334 BC), also called the Pre-Sargonic period (referring to Sargon of Akkad), Uruk continued to be ruled by Ur.

Early Dynastic, Akkadian, and Neo-Sumerian Rulers of Uruk

Dynastic categorizations are deribed solely from the Sumerian King List, which is of ptoblrmatichistorical accuracy; the organization might be analogous to Manetho's.

In 2009, two different copies of an inscription were put forth as evidence of a 19th-century BC ruler of Uruk named Naram-sin

Uruk continued as principality of Ur, Babylon, and later Achaemenid, Seleucid, and Parthian Empires. It enjoyed brief periods of independence during the Isin-Larsa period, under kings such as (possibly) Ikūn-pî-Ištar (c. 1800 BC), Sîn-kāšid, his son Sîn-irībam, his son Sîn-gāmil, Ilum-gāmil, brother of Sîn-gāmil, Etēia, Anam, ÌR-ne-ne, who was defeated by Rīm-Sîn I of Larsa in his year 14 (c. 1740 BC), Rīm-Anum and Nabi-ilīšu. It is now believed that another king, Narām-Sîn, briefly ruled before Sîn-kāšid. The city was finally destroyed by the Arab invasion of Mesopotamia and abandoned c. 700 AD.

Architecture

Uruk has some of the first monumental constructions in architectural history, and certainly the largest of its era. Much of Near Eastern architecture can trace its roots to these prototypical buildings. The structures of Uruk are cited by two different naming conventions, one in German from the initial expedition, and the English translation of the same. The stratigraphy of the site is complex and as such much of the dating is disputed. In general, the structures follow the two main typologies of Sumerian architecture, Tripartite with 3 parallel halls and T-Shaped also with three halls, but the central one extends into two perpendicular bays at one end. The following table summarizes the significant architecture of the Eanna and Anu Districts.  Temple N, Cone-Mosaic Courtyard, and Round Pillar Hall are often referred to as a single structure; the Cone-Mosaic Temple.

It is clear Eanna was dedicated to Inanna symbolized by Venus from the Uruk period. At that time, she was worshipped in four aspects as Inanna of the netherworld (Sumerian: dinanna-kur), Inanna of the morning (Sumerian: dinanna-hud2), Inanna of the evening (Sumerian: dinanna-sig), and Inanna (Sumerian: dinanna-NUN).  The names of four temples in Uruk at this time are known, but it is impossible to match them with either a specific structure and in some cases a deity.
 sanctuary of Inanna (Sumerian: eš-dinanna)
 sanctuary of Inanna of the evening (Sumerian: eš-dinanna-sig)
 temple of heaven (Sumerian: e2-an)
 temple of heaven and netherworld (Sumerian: e2-an-ki)

Archaeology

There are three major tells within the site: The Eanna district, Bit Resh (Kullaba), and Irigal.

The location of Uruk was first scouted by William Loftus in 1849. He excavated there in 1850 and 1854. By Loftus' own account, he admits that the first excavations were superficial at best, as his financiers forced him to deliver large museum artifacts at a minimal cost. Warka was also scouted by archaeologist Walter Andrae in 1902.

 From 1912 to 1913, Julius Jordan and his team from the German Oriental Society discovered the temple of Ishtar, one of four known temples located at the site. The temples at Uruk were quite remarkable as they were constructed with brick and adorned with colorful mosaics. Jordan also discovered part of the city wall. Utilizing sedimentary strata dating techniques, this wall is estimated to have been erected around 3000 BC.
The GOS returned to Uruk in 1928 and excavated until 1939, when World War II intervened. The team was led by Jordan until 1931, then by A. Nöldeke, Ernst Heinrich, and H. J. Lenzen.

The German excavations resumed after the war and were under the direction of Heinrich Lenzen from 1953 to 1967. He was followed in 1968 by J. Schmidt, and in 1978 by R.M. Boehmer. In total, the German archaeologists spent 39 seasons working at Uruk. The results are documented in two series of reports:
 Ausgrabungen der Deutschen Forschungsgemeinschaft in Uruk (ADFU), 17 volumes, 1912–2001 (titles listed at the German Archaeological Institute Index 38e378adbb1f14a174490017f0000011)
 Ausgrabungen in Uruk-Warka, Endberichte (AUWE), 25 volumes, 1987–2007 (titles listed at the German Archaeological Institute Index 108)

Most recently, from 2001 to 2002, the German Archaeological Institute team led by Margarete van Ess, with Joerg Fassbinder and Helmut Becker, conducted a partial magnetometer survey in Uruk. In addition to the geophysical survey, core samples and aerial photographs were taken. This was followed up with high-resolution satellite imagery in 2005. Work resumed in 2016 and is currently concentrated on the city wall area and a survey of the surrounding landscape.

Cuneiform Tablets

Proto-cuneiform clay tablets were found at Uruk with Sumerian and pictorial inscriptions that are thought to be some of the earliest recorded writing, dating to approximately 3300 BC. Later cuneiform tablets were deciphered and include the famous SKL, a record of kings of the Sumerian civilization. There was an even larger cache of legal and scholarly tablets of the Neo-Babylonian, Late Babylonian, and Seleucid period, that have been published by Adam Falkenstein and other Assyriological members of the German Archaeological Institute in Baghdad as Jan J. A. Djik, Hermann Hunger, Antoine Cavigneaux, Egbert von Weiher, and Karlheinz Kessler, or others as Erlend Gehlken. Many of the cuneiform tablets form acquisitions by museums and collections as the British Museum, Yale Babylonian Collection, and the Louvre. The later holds a unique cuneiform tablet in Aramaic known as the Aramaic Uruk incantation.

The oldest known writing to feature a person's name was found in Uruk, in the form of several tablets that mention Kushim, who (assuming they are an individual person) served as an accountant recording transactions made in trading barley - 29,086 measures barley 37 months Kushim.

Beveled rim bowls were the most common type of container used during the Uruk period. They are believed to be vessels for serving rations of food or drink to dependent laborers. The introduction of the fast wheel for throwing pottery was developed during the later part of the Uruk period, and made the mass production of pottery simpler and more standardized.

Artifacts

The Mask of Warka, also known as the 'Lady of Uruk' and the 'Sumerian Mona Lisa', dating from 3100 BC, is one of the earliest representations of the human face. The carved marble female face is probably a depiction of Inanna. It is approximately 20 cm tall, and may have been incorporated into a larger cult image. The mask was looted from the Iraq Museum during the fall of Baghdad in April 2003. It was recovered in September 2003 and returned to the museum.

List of rulers of Uruk
The following list should not be considered complete:

See also

 List of cities of the ancient Near East
 Blau Monuments
 Warka Vase
 Chronology of the ancient Near East
 Geography of Mesopotamia
 Historical urban community sizes

Notes

References
 
 
 
 
 Fassbinder, J.W.E., and H. Becker, Magnetometry at Uruk (Iraq): The city of King Gilgamesh, Archaeologia Polona, vol. 41, pp. 122–124, 2003

Further reading
 
 
 
 
 
 
 
 Krystyna Szarzyńska, Observations on the Temple Precinct EŠ3 in Archaic Uruk,  Journal of Cuneiform Studies, vol. 63, pp. 1–4, 2011
 
 Eva Strommenger, The Chronological Division of the Archaic Levels of Uruk-Eanna VI to III/II: Past and Present, American Journal of Archaeology, vol. 84, no. 4, pp. 479–487, (Oct., 1980)

External Links

 Archaeologists unearth ancient Sumerian riverboat in Iraq - Ars Technica - 4/8/2022
 News from Old Uruk - Margarete van Ess 2021 Oriental Institute lecture on recent work
 Earliest evidence for large scale organized warfare in the Mesopotamian world (Hamoukar vs. Uruk?)
 Uruk at CDLI wiki
 Lament for Unug  
 Archaeological Expedition Mapping Ancient City Of Uruk in 2002
 Digital images of tablets from Uruk - CDLI

Populated places established in the 4th millennium BC
Populated places disestablished in the 7th century
Muthanna Governorate
Epic of Gilgamesh
Ancient Mesopotamia
Archaeological sites in Iraq
Former populated places in Iraq
Ubaid period
Nimrod
Cuneiform
Assyriology
Jemdet Nasr period
Former kingdoms